Elisa Sophia Schmidt (born 14 February 1990), known by the stage names Femme Schmidt and SCHMIDT, is a German singer.

Life 
Schmidt grew up in Koblenz. When 16, she visited Hurtwood House near Dorking, Surrey, England, where she began writing songs in English. At age 17, she left for the USA for a year, returning to Munich, Germany, afterwards for finishing school.

Since her childhood she had the wish to become a musician and worked towards that goal. In June 2010, Schmidt signed with Warner Music Group.

Schmidt lives in Berlin and London.

Career 
Schmidt released her first EP, Above Sin City, in October 2011. Her full-length album, Femme SCHMIDT, followed in May 2012. Schmidt Femme SCHMIDT debuted at No. 86 on the German iTunes charts. She collaborated with Guy Chambers on both releases.

Schmidt has performed as an opening act for Melanie C, best known as a member of the Spice Girls. Later in 2012, Schmidt is scheduled to open for Elton John and Lionel Richie. In 2017 she opened some gigs of Coldplay's A Head Full of Dreams Tour.

Music 
Guy Chambers calls his and Schmidt's genre pop noir. Schmidt describes it as combination of cabaret-jazz and modern pop. She feels inspired by Marlene Dietrich, Kurt Weill, Billie Holiday and Norah Jones.

Discography

Albums 
 Above Sin City EP, Warner Music, October 2011
 Femme SCHMIDT, Warner Music, May 2012
 RAW, Warner Music, March 2016

Singles/EPs 
In the Photo Booth, Warner Music, April 2012

Other works 
Richest Girl (with Ivy Quainoo), March 2012

References

External links 

 Official website
 Official Facebook page
 SCHMIDTs label Warner Music

1990 births
German jazz singers
Living people
Musicians from Koblenz
21st-century German women singers
German women singer-songwriters